Ngororero District is a district (akarere) in Western Province, Rwanda. Its capital is the town of Ngororero.

Location
The district is one of the Seven (7) districts that comprise Rwanda's Western Province. It is bordered by Nyabihu District to the north, Gakenke District to the northwest, Rutsiro District to the west and Karongi District to the south; all in Western Province. Muhanga District in Southern Province, lies to the east of Ngororero District. The coordinates of Ngororero District are:1° 52'S, 29° 39'E (Latitude:-1.866667; Longitude:29.650000).

Sectors
Ngororero district is divided into 13 sectors (imirenge): Bwira, Gatumba, Hindiro, Kabaya, Kageyo, Kavumu, Matyazo, Muhanda, Muhororo, Ndaro, Ngororero, Nyange and Sovu.

Population
In 2002, the population of Ngororero District was estimated  at 282,249 people.

See also
 Provinces of Rwanda
 Districts of Rwanda

References

External links
 Website of Ngororero District
 Website of Western Province, Rwanda
 

 
Western Province, Rwanda
Districts of Rwanda